Super Spike V'Ball/Nintendo World Cup is a Nintendo Entertainment System multicart which combines two games:

 Super Spike V'Ball
 Nintendo World Cup

Nintendo video game compilations